Anomaloglossus is a genus of frogs in the family Aromobatidae. The genus is endemic to the Guiana Shield in northern South America. It used to be placed in the family Dendrobatidae (together with other genera in the current Aromobatidae), and is still placed in that family by some sources. The name of the genus, from the Greek anomalos (=irregular, unusual) and glossa (=tongue), refers to the unusual tongue bearing the median lingual process, the only unambiguous phenotypic synapomorphy of this genus.

Description
Anomaloglossus are characterized by cryptic dorsal coloration (brown or gray). Dorsal skin is posteriorly granular. The toes are webbed, ranging from basal to extensive. The fingers have weakly expanded discs. Many species show large intraspecific morphological variability and lack of morphological characters that would allow easy species identification.

The tadpoles can be either exotrophic or endotrophic.

Species
The following 30 species are recognised in the genus Anomaloglossus:

References

 
Aromobatidae
Amphibian genera
Amphibians of South America
Taxa named by Janalee P. Caldwell
Taxa named by Darrel Frost
Taxa named by Taran Grant
Taxa named by Philippe J.R. Kok
Taxa named by D. Bruce Means
Taxa named by Walter E. Schargel